Yosefa Lazen (born January 13, 1971, as Yosefa Dahari) is an Israeli singer born of Yemeni-Jewish and Moroccan-Jewish parents. Her style blends world beat electronic dance music beats, rap and soul with traditional singing styles of the Morocco and Yemen. She lives in Israel.

Early life 
Yosefa's parents introduced her to the music of the Middle East and North Africa when she was growing up. Her Jewish father was from Yemen, while her Jewish mother was from Morocco.

Dahari began singing during her Israeli military (IDF) service. Once, while stationed near the Lebanon border, she performed Arabic folk songs and received praise from the other side of the border. Such responses prompted her to pursue her Arabic musical roots, and after completing her military service, she became a professional singer.

Music career 
Her recordings include Middle Eastern instruments such as the kanun, oud, zourna, darbouka and tin drum, as well as European instruments. Her style has been characterized as following in the tradition of the late Yemeni-Israeli singer Ofra Haza. Most of her songs are in Hebrew, while she also sang in Maghrebi and English.

Discography
Yosefa (Trolika, 1993)
The Desert Speaks (EMI Hemisphere, 1996)
Lullaby Composed - Martin Kennedy (UK) Single (Unknown, about 1997)

Notes

Arabic-language singers of Israel
Israeli dance musicians
Jewish Israeli musicians
Jewish women singers
Israeli people of Moroccan-Jewish descent
Israeli people of Yemeni-Jewish descent
20th-century Israeli Jews
21st-century Israeli Jews
Israeli pop singers
Living people
Israeli Sephardi Jews
Israeli Mizrahi Jews
20th-century Israeli women singers
21st-century Israeli women singers
1971 births